Mexican Eagle or Mexican eagle may refer to:
American golden eagle (Aquila chrysaetos canadensis)
Mexican Eagle Petroleum Company, a former Mexican oil company